Hao Lei (born 1 November 1978) is a Chinese actress and singer, known for her starring roles in Lou Ye's films Summer Palace (2006) and Mystery (2012).

Biography
In 2003, Hao Lei starred in Liao Yimei's play Rhinoceros in Love in Shanghai, Beijing, Shenzhen and Seoul.

In 2006, Hao starred in Lou Ye's film Summer Palace. The film was well-received abroad, but banned in China, due to its depiction of the Tiananmen Square protests of 1989 and nudity.

Filmography

Films

TV series

Discography

Album

Other songs

Awards and nominations

References

External links 
Hao Lei on Sina Weibo

Chinese stage actresses
Actresses from Jilin
1978 births
Living people
People from Tonghua
Shanghai Theatre Academy alumni
20th-century Chinese actresses
21st-century Chinese actresses
Chinese film actresses
Chinese television actresses
People's Republic of China Buddhists
Singers from Jilin
Chinese songwriters
Writers from Jilin
21st-century Chinese women singers